JP Morgan Indian Investment Trust is a large British investment trust dedicated to investments in India. Established in 1994, the company will become a constituent of the FTSE 250 Index, an index of the larger companies on the London Stock Exchange, on 27 September 2022.

The chairman is Hugh Bolland. The company is managed by J. P. Morgan Asset Management. In January 2020, the company announced a return of capital of £195 million to shareholders.

References

External links
  Official site

Investment trusts of the United Kingdom
Financial services companies established in 1994
JPMorgan Chase
Inward investment
Investment in India